Kabylites is a narrow, straight shelled Lower Cretaceous ancyloceratid resembling Bochianites in general form.  Kabylites differs from Bochianites in having an umbilical lobe more or less the same size as the first lateral lobe.  In Bochianites the umbilical lobe is much reduced in size.

Kabylites, which is known from Europe, north Africa, and Japan, also follows Bochianites sequentially, first appearing in the Barremian and continuing into the Lower Aptian.  Bochianites lasted from the Tithonian at the end of the Jurassic to the Hauterivian which just precedes the Barremian.

References

Treatise on Invertebrate Paleontology, Part L  (Mollusca 4, Cephalopoda  Ammoidea) Geological Soc. of America and University of Kansas Press. 1957 (L307)
Paleobiology Database Kabylites entry

Cretaceous ammonites
Ammonites of Europe
Barremian life